Koshish is a 1972 Indian Hindi-language romantic drama movie starring Sanjeev Kumar and Jaya Bhaduri, written and directed by Gulzar. The movie depicts a deaf and mute couple and their conflicts, pain and struggle to carve out a niche for themselves in a desensitized society. It was inspired by the 1961 Japanese film Happiness of Us Alone. The film was remade in Tamil in 1977 as Uyarndhavargal starring Kamal Haasan and Sujatha.

The film won two National Film Awards for Best Screenplay to Gulzar and Best Actor to Kumar.

Plot
Haricharan and Aarti are a poor couple who are deaf and mute. They fall in love with each other and get married. Haricharan works as a shoe-shiner to earn a living. Later, they have a child, but the child dies because of a greedy man named Kanu. The couple is devastated, but later they are blessed with a second child and they lead a happy life. One day, a police officer sees Haricharan and impressed by his kind and honest nature, he gives him a job. Soon, Haricharan earns more and their financial condition improves. Their son, grows up. Years later, Aarti dies. Haricharan gets employed in a company. His employer's daughter is deaf and mute and the employer wants to fix Haricharan's son's wedding to his daughter. Haricharan declines as his employer is richer than him but the employer convinces him. Seeing, the daughter, Haricharan gets memories of Aarti and agrees for the marriage. The son opposes the alliance as she is deaf and mute, much to Haricharan's distress. He berates him, and tells that even his mother was mute too. The son realises his mistake and agrees to marry the employer's daughter.

Cast
Sanjeev Kumar as Haricharan Mathur "Hari"
Jaya Bhaduri as Aarti Mathur 
Om Shivpuri as Narayan 
Asrani as Kanu 
Dina Pathak as Durga 
Seema Deo as Teacher
 Yash Sharma as bicycle storage keeper 
Moolchand 
Dilip Kumar as himself (Guest Appearance)

Music

Awards and nominations

References

External links
 

1972 films
1970s Hindi-language films
Indian Sign Language films
Films featuring a Best Actor National Award-winning performance
Films about disability in India
Hindi films remade in other languages
Films directed by Gulzar
Films whose writer won the Best Original Screenplay National Film Award
Indian remakes of Japanese films